A number of steamships have been named Venezuela, including:

, a French cargo liner wrecked in 1920

Ship names